Jōkichi, Jokichi or Joukichi (written: 譲吉 or 丈吉) is a masculine Japanese given name. Notable people with the name include:

, Japanese supercentenarian
, Japanese chemist

Japanese masculine given names